Abha is the capital of 'Asir Region in Saudi Arabia, with a population of 1,093,705 as of 2021. Abha's mild climate makes it a popular tourist destination for Saudis. Saudis also call the city the Bride of Mountain due to its position above the sea.

History

Abha was the capital city for the Prince of Asir Ibn Ayde under the authority of the Ottoman Empire until World War I. In 1918, the Prince of Asir, Yahya bin Hasun Al Ayde, grandson of Ibn Ayed, returned to his family throne conquered in Abha with complete independence. In 1920, Asir was conquered by the Ikhwan tribesmen of Nejd loyal to Ibn Saud during the Unification of Saudi Arabia. Abha has many historic places such as forts and other locations, thanks to the region's cultural heritage. Bani Shehr, Bani Amr, Bal-Ahmar, Bal-Asmar, Bal-Qarn, Shumran and some others all belong to "Al-Azd" and some extended families Qahtan, Shahran which is belong to Hood. Azdi tribes had migrated after "Marib Dam" collapsed for the third time in the third century AD. Al-Namas, Billasmar Region, Hawra Billasmar Center, Khaled, Eyaa Valley, Athneen Billasmar (which is the capital), Subuh Billahmar, Al-Nimas, Tanomah, Al-Majaredah place, Bal-Qarn Center, and Sabt Alalyaa place (Bishah, Wadi Bin Hashbaal) and some other known places that belong to the Asir Region.

In 2015, a group of terrorists attacked a big mosque in Abha. Some of the people who were killed were police officers. In later years, some places in Abha, including the international airport, were attacked by Yemeni terrorists.

Transportation
A coastal road connecting Jeddah and Abha was completed in 1979. A SAPTCO bus station connects Abha to other destinations within Saudi Arabia.

Abha International Airport (IATA: AHB[3], ICAO: OEAB) is Abha's main airport. International connections are available to Yemen (Sana'a), Egypt (Cairo), Qatar (Doha) and the UAE (Dubai, Sharjah), as well as to other destinations within Saudi Arabia. Construction of Dutch-designed Abha Airport began in mid-1975, and flights began in 1977. Before construction of the airport, domestic flights were serviced by the military airport near Khamis Mushait by Ali Misfer Ibn Misfer, who was the founder of aviation in Abha in 1945.

Landmarks
The city of Abha is composed of four quarters, the largest of which contains a fortress. Hilltop fortresses are a characteristic feature of the city. Shadda Palace, built in 1927, is now a museum displaying local handicrafts and household items. Other notable buildings in Abha include the Abha Great Mosque, the Al-Tahy restaurant, the Abha Palace Hotel, and the funpark next to Lake Sadd. The head office and the main printing presses of Al Watan, a major Saudi daily, are in Abha.

Culture
The Saudi government has promoted Abha as a tourist destination. The city hosts events to attract visitors to the city and its surroundings, including the summer Abha Festival, sporting events, shows, exhibitions, and musical performances poets and singers. The artist Talal Maddah died on stage during one such performance in Abha.

Education
King Khalid University is a public university in Abha. The University was established in 1998 by merging the Imam Muhammed bin Saud University of Islamic Studies and the King Saud University of the South. The total number of enrolled students is approximately 85,000.

Geography and climate

Abha lies on the western edge of Mount Al-Hijaz, near Jabal Sawda, the highest peak in Saudi Arabia. Treating the Asir Mountains as part of the Sarawat, the landscape is otherwise dominated by the Sarawat Mountains.

The climate of Abha is Subtropical Highland Climate (Köppen: Cwb) and it is influenced by city's high elevation.[inaccessible source] The city's weather is generally mild throughout the year, becoming noticeably cooler during the "low-sun" season. Abha seldom sees temperatures rise above  during the course of the year. The city averages  of rainfall annually, with the bulk of the precipitation occurring between February and April, with a secondary minor wet season in July and August.

Gallery

Ecology
The Garf Raydah Protected Area is heavily colonized by cacti, olive trees, and junipers.

See also

 Al-Bahah
 An-Namas
 Bareq
 Billasmar Region
 Habala
Rijal Alma
 Khamis Mushayt
Tanomah

References

External links

 - PhD Thesis

 
Qahtanites
Populated places in 'Asir Province
Provincial capitals of Saudi Arabia